is a railway station located at the Nishi-Ochiai itchōme intersection of Mejiro Dōri, Shin-Mejiro Dōri and Shin-Ōme-Kaidō in Shinjuku, Tokyo, Japan. This station is served by the Toei Ōedo Line. The Station number is E-33.

History
The station opened on December 19, 1997, when Line 12 was extended from Nerima to Shinjuku. Line 12 was renamed the Ōedo line on April 20, 2000.

The station lies on the boundary of Shinjuku and Toshima wards. Before the station opened the name was intended to be simply Minami-Nagasaki (named after the neighborhood in Toshima ward), but the name was changed to reflect its position on the boundary.

Lines
Toei Ōedo Line

Platforms
The platform is an island platform with two tracks.

Surroundings
 Kato Precision Railroad Models

External links 

 

Railway stations in Japan opened in 1997
Toei Ōedo Line
Stations of Tokyo Metropolitan Bureau of Transportation
Railway stations in Tokyo